Ali Kaes (born 4 April 1955, in Diekirch) is a Luxembourgish politician for the Christian Social People's Party.  He is a member of the national legislature, the Chamber of Deputies, representing the Nord constituency since the 2004 election.

He is currently mayor of Tandel, being the commune's first mayor since its creation on 1 January 2006.  Kaes was previously the mayor of Bastendorf, one of the two communes that merged to form Tandel, having held that position since 1 January 1994.  Prior to that, he had been a councillor in Bastendorf (1989–1993).

Footnotes

External links
  Chamber of Deputies official biography

Mayors of places in Luxembourg
Tandel
Members of the Chamber of Deputies (Luxembourg)
Members of the Chamber of Deputies (Luxembourg) from Nord
Councillors in Luxembourg
Christian Social People's Party politicians
Luxembourgian trade unionists
1955 births
Living people
People from Diekirch